Illey is a village near Halesowen (where population details as taken at the 2011 census can be found), in the Metropolitan Borough of Dudley, England.

History

The Parish was originally part of Shropshire, but was transferred to Worcestershire in 1844, where it remained until 1974.

Villages in the West Midlands (county)
Halesowen